"Mad Summer" is the first single released from Maria Arredondo's album, Not Going Under. It was released on 14 June 2004 and was the first Arredondo single to become a video.

Track listing
Norwegian CD Single
"Mad Summer" - 03:07
"Mad Summer" (Jr. Grandoza Remix) - 04:36

Charts

References

Maria Arredondo songs
Songs written by Espen Lind
2004 singles
Songs written by Amund Bjørklund
2004 songs
Song recordings produced by Espionage (production team)